Matthieu Verstraete is an American physicist, currently (December 2022) at University of Liège and an Elected Fellow of the American Physical Society. He has been the chair of the steering committee of the European The European Theoretical Spectroscopy Facility and a member of the international advisory committee of ABINIT (The opensource DFT software).

References

Year of birth missing (living people)
Living people
Fellows of the American Physical Society
21st-century American physicists